Karen Maruyama (born May 29, 1958) is an American actress and comedian.

Career
Maruyama has appeared on television in supporting roles in a number of sitcoms, including recurring characters on The Jamie Foxx Show, Strip Mall, Suddenly Susan, and Arrested Development. Maruyama is well known as an improv performer and instructor, and was a featured guest on the American and British versions of Whose Line Is It Anyway?, as well as being a member of The Groundlings. She also appeared as a parking lot attendant in an episode of Curb Your Enthusiasm.

She played a nurse in The Bucket List (2007) and a housekeeper in the 2012 film The Campaign. She is part of the cast of The Jim Henson Company's live stage show "Puppet Up! - Uncensored" which has toured to Aspen, Las Vegas, Edinburgh, Sydney and Melbourne and is currently appearing monthly at Avalon Hollywood.

Maruyama was also featured as a fashion victim in an episode of the makeover show How Do I Look?.  She also appeared as a non-celebrity contestant on the 1984 CBS game show, Body Language, under the name Karen Upshaw, saying she was from Perris, California. She was paired with celebrity players Ted Lange and Constance Towers. She was also on The New $25,000 Pyramid in 1983 with Audrey Landers and Michael McKean.

Filmography

References

External links

Karen Maruyama at the "Whose Line is it Anyway?" Encyclopedia

1958 births
American film actresses
American television actresses
Living people
American women comedians
American comedians of Asian descent
Place of birth missing (living people)
American actresses of Japanese descent
American film actors of Asian descent
20th-century American actresses
21st-century American actresses
People from Perris, California
Comedians from California
20th-century American comedians
21st-century American comedians